Jordan Francis is a Canadian rapper and actor.

Career 
He got his first acting role at the age of seven and he recorded his first song when he was eleven years old.  He later switched to live theatre and he appeared as Young Simba in the Mirvish Productions' The Lion King at the Princess of Wales Theatre. In 2008 he got a role in the Disney production Camp Rock, and that same year his song Hasta Lavista was number 43 on Billboard music charts. In 2010 he appeared in the debut of the series called Connor Undercover as the hero’s sidekick. In 2012 he did a Canadian cross country tour for the CBC Television and interactive series Cross Country Fun Hunt.

Filmography

Film

Television

Tours 
2010: Jonas Brothers Live in Concert

References

External links
Last Fm Stats

 Projam Projam - Official YouTube Channel

Canadian male child actors
Canadian male television actors
Canadian male voice actors
Canadian male film actors
Living people
1991 births